The Commission of Inquiry on War Criminals in Canada, often referred to as the Deschênes Commission, was established by the government of Canada in February 1985 to investigate claims that Canada had become a haven for Nazi war criminals. Headed by retired Quebec Superior Court judge Jules Deschênes, the commission delivered its report in December 1986 after almost two years of hearings.

In 1985, Prime Minister Brian Mulroney ordered an investigation into the presence of Nazi war criminals in Canada after a member of Parliament claimed infamous Nazi doctor Joseph Mengele might be in the country. Mengele had indeed attempted to immigrate to Canada in 1962, and Canadian officials were aware of this at the time.

The commission's final report was issued at the end of 1986 in two parts. The first part concluded that alleged Nazi war criminals had immigrated to Canada and in some cases were still residing in the country. The commission took a very broad approach to its mandate, investigating both allegations of war crimes (which were well-defined) and crimes against humanity (which at the time was a relatively new concept that concerned crimes that were not previously considered war crimes). The commission recommended changes to criminal and citizenship law to allow Canada to prosecute war criminals. In June 1987, the House of Commons passed legislation that allowed for the prosecution of foreign war crimes in Canadian courts and the deportation of naturalized war criminals. The second part of the final report, which concerned allegations against specific individuals, remains confidential and has never been made public.

Canadian prosecutors pressed charges against at least four men on allegations of participation in Holocaust war crimes. One case ended in acquittal; two cases were dropped when prosecutors had trouble obtaining overseas evidence; the fourth case was stayed due to the health of the defendant. Since 1998, courts have found that six men misrepresented their wartime activities and could have their citizenship revoked although this was not done because the evidence was circumstantial and insufficient.  Another seven people subject to deportation or citizenship-revocation procedures have died. 

Some individuals have criticized the commission for either exceeding its mandate or being overly influenced by foreign governments. Olga Bertelsen published an article undermining the claims made by the commission, and claiming that the Soviet KGB framed an innocent man, Ivan ("John") Demjanjuk, as part of a larger attempt (referred to as "Operation Payback") by the KGB to sow discord between Canadian Jews and Ukrainians. Nonetheless, Demjanjuk was ultimately found guilty by a German court and died behind bars. Lubomyr Luciuk, professor at the Royal Military College of Kingston, has also been critical of the commission, and has written letters to the editor of Canadian newspapers on the matter. Luciuk has stated his belief that the claims made by the commission are grossly exaggerated. While the commission's final report did state that the numbers were grossly exaggerated, the report also admitted it had not investigated materials kept either in the Soviet Union or Eastern Bloc countries, and that it further had not investigated an addendum list of 109 names provided late in the inquiry. Further still, it was later revealed that the commission withheld evidence and ignored the findings of other war crimes trials, such as the Nuremberg trials. The commission's decision to find the Waffen-SS 14th Galicia Division not guilty of collective war crimes was particularly controversial, as the SS had already been determined to have committed war crimes as an organization at earlier war crimes trials. It is thus difficult to determine whether the commission's conclusion that the number of suspected war criminals who either had or were residing in Canada was in fact exaggerated, given how much potential evidence wasn't considered.

By contrast, experts in the field have long argued that Canada had an open door to war criminals, and that the country did far too little to prosecute the alleged war criminals and collaborators who had found refuge there. Historian Irving Abella stated to Mike Wallace of 60 Minutes it was relatively easy for former SS members to enter Canada, as their distinctive tattoos meant they were reliably anti-Communist. Bernie Farber, then the director of the Canadian Jewish Congress, stated Nazis in Canada, of which there were estimated to be 3,000, was Canada's 'dirty little secret'. In the late-1990s, the issue of war criminals living in Canada, and the Canadian government's lack of interest in searching for and prosecuting these individuals, was the subject of investigative reporting by NBC, CBS, the CBC, Global Television, and the New York Times.

References

External links
 The actual report of the Commission of Inquiry on War Criminals is available on-line (in English and French)
 B'nai B'rith Canada, "Traditional holding pattern on Nazi-era cases has made Canada a magnet for modern day war criminals, says B’nai Brith," August 18, 2006.
 David Matas, "Seeking Global Justice," (Remarks to the federal Liberal caucus immigration roundtable, Regina, Saskatchewan, August 23, 2005).
 Gloria Galloway, "Deportation calls mount against elderly Nazi 'enablers,'" The Globe and Mail 30 Jan. 2007.
 David Pugliese, "Whitewashing the SS: the Attempt to Re-Write the History of Hitler’s Collaborators Esprit-de-Corps 30 Oct. 2020

World War II crimes
Canadian commissions and inquiries